The Alcibiades Stakes is an American Thoroughbred horse race run annually in early October at Keeneland Race Course in Lexington, Kentucky. A Grade I race, it is open to two-year-old fillies willing to race one and one-sixteenth miles on the dirt. Sponsored by Darley Racing since 2003, the Alcibiades Stakes was named for Hal Price Headley's great foundation mare Alcibiades.

The race is currently part of the Breeders' Cup Challenge series. The winner will automatically qualify for the Breeders' Cup Juvenile Fillies.

The race obtained Graded stakes race status in 1973 and was a Grade III race through 1975, a Grade II from 1976 through 2006 and elevated in 2007 to Grade I status with a current purse of $500,000.

Inaugurated in 1952 as a seven furlong race, from 1956 through 1980 it was run at  seven furlongs, 184 feet. In 1981 it was changed to its present distances of  miles.

The Alcibiades Stakes was raced on dirt until 2006 when Keeneland Race Course installed the synthetic Polytrack surface. In 2014, the Polytrack was replaced by a new dirt surface.

Records
Time record: (at present distance of  miles)
 1:42.80 – Silverbulletday (1998)

Most wins by an owner
 4 – Leslie Combs II (1957, 1967, 1978. 1983)

Most wins by a jockey
 3 – Don Brumfield (1968, 1972, 1982)
 3 – Rafael Bejarano (2004, 2007, 2010)

Most wins by a trainer
 6 – D. Wayne Lukas (1983, 1988, 1989, 1993, 1995, 2003)

Winners

See also
Road to the Kentucky Oaks

References

Keeneland horse races
Flat horse races for two-year-old fillies
Breeders' Cup Challenge series
Grade 1 stakes races in the United States
Graded stakes races in the United States
Horse races established in 1952
1952 establishments in Kentucky
Recurring sporting events established in 1952